Santa Caterina is a Roman Catholic church located in the town of Cingoli, province of Macerata, region of Marche, Italy.

History
The church was built originally in 1217 near the Hospital dello Spineto. It was reconstructed in the first half of the 18th century in its present state. The interior has a centralized plan and contains a decorated choir area.

References

18th-century Roman Catholic church buildings in Italy
Centralized-plan churches in Italy
Baroque architecture in Marche
Roman Catholic churches in Cingoli